Richard Southwell Windham Robert Wyndham-Quin, 6th Earl of Dunraven and Mount-Earl,  (18 May 1887 – 28 August 1965) was an Irish peer. The son of Windham Wyndham-Quin, 5th Earl of Dunraven and Mount-Earl, he succeeded to the Earldom in 1952 on the death of his father.

Biography
Lord Dunraven fought in World War I where he was wounded and mentioned in despatches. He gained the rank of Captain in the 12th Royal Lancers and was awarded the Military Cross (MC).

Dunraven was appointed Commander of the Order of the British Empire (CBE) in 1921 and Companion of the Order of the Bath (CB) in 1923.

Marriages and children
Lord Dunraven married firstly Helen Lindsay Swire on 20 October 1915. They had no children and were divorced in 1932.

Dunraven married secondly Nancy Yuille (1902–1994) on 7 March 1934. They had three children:

 Lady Melissa Eva Caroline Wyndham-Quin (16 February 1935 – 5 January 2021), married Sir George Brooke, 3rd Baronet, on 25 June 1959 and has issue.
 Lady Caroline Olein Geraldine Wyndham-Quin (born 14 September 1936), married John Beresford, 8th Marquess of Waterford, on 23 July 1957 and has issue, including Henry Beresford, 9th Marquess of Waterford.
 Thady Windham Thomas Wyndham-Quin, 7th (and last) Earl of Dunraven and Mount-Earl (27 October 1939 – 25 March 2011)

References

1887 births
1965 deaths
Earls of Dunraven and Mount-Earl
Companions of the Order of the Bath
Commanders of the Order of the British Empire